USAT Sicilien was the Danish motor vessel MS Sicilien built in 1938. After Germany occupied Denmark 9 April 1940 Danish ships were considered enemy ships by Britain and France and subject to seizure.  Sicilien was one of forty that sought refuge in the neutral United States. On 30 March 1941 those ships were seized by the United States  and requisitioned on 23 July 1941. The ship was then turned over to the United States Army for operation as a United States Army Transport.

As an Army transport the ship made a notable contribution to establishment of a system of weather stations, designated Crystal stations, in the Arctic starting in late September 1941. Sicilien and a fleet of small vessels established stations first proposed as bases on the Crimson air ferry route but first established as weather stations. In June 1942 the ship was transporting Army cargo and troops from Kingston, Jamaica to San Juan, Puerto Rico when torpedoed and sunk by U-172 with loss of 46 of the 77 persons aboard.

Construction 
Sicilien, yard number 252, was constructed in 1938 by Helsingørs Jernskibs og Maskinbyggeri A/S, Elsinore, Denmark for Det Forenede Dampskibs Selskab (DFDS), Copenhagen, Denmark. The company had delivered two nearly identical ships for DFDS,  (hull #231) and Marocco (hull #232), in 1936 that were nominally  less in capacity than the later ships but with identical dimensions. Algier (hull #251) and Sicilien were delivered in 1938.

Sicilien, signal OYWY, was a one deck vessel with a cruiser stern,   registered length,  beam and  depth. A shipyard photo of the apparent launch is dated 21 June 1938.

History 
Sicilien was one of four similar cargo ships in commercial service for Det Forenede Dampskibs Selskab (DFDS), Copenhagen, operating between northwest Europe and the Mediterranean. After war began in Europe Sicilien and the three other new ships Tunis, Marocco, Algier were put into Atlantic service. The change was due to a surge in freight to North and South America. The ship arrived in New York on the day before Germany occupied Denmark on 9 April 1940. Sicilien and a similar company ship, Tunis, were in New York when the United States government seized Danish ships on 30 March 1941.

There was no Danish government in exile, the government completely subject to German influence, and Danish ships were thus considered by Britain and France to be enemy ships subject to seizure. Danish ships not seized by the belligerents sought refuge in neutral ports, particularly the United States. In New York a Danish Shipping Committee, without government powers, attempted to negotiate an "understanding" with representatives of the British and French governments without success. Under German pressure the Danish government ordered the ships in neutral ports to remain there and their crews to refuse any service including a law in Denmark prohibiting crews in neutral ports to sign on with other ships. The shortage of ships and crews among the Allied belligerents and neutral United States led to the United States seizing Danish ships on 30 March 1941. Denmark officially protested the seizure as against international law and demanding immediate return to no avail.

Sicilien was one of forty Danish merchant vessels, totaling , seized by the United States Coast Guard and then requisitioned for use or transfer of title under the Ship Requisition Act. Most of the Danish ships were delivered to the War Shipping Administration (WSA), registered in Panama for diplomatic reasons, and operated under new names by commercial companies as WSA agents. Sicilien was delivered to WSA  in New York on 12 July 1941 and delivered under Executive Order by WSA to the Army under bareboat charter on 23 July for operation as an Army Transport.

Sicilien was the main transport for establishment of an air ferry route that would allow shorter range aircraft to fly from Newfoundland to Scotland by way of Greenland and Iceland. Surveys made during June and July 1941 selected sites for the route, designated the  Crimson Route, but winter would preclude any construction. Instead the Army established weather stations designated at Crystal I at Fort Chimo, Labrador, Crystal II at the upper end of Frobisher Bay and Crystal III off the northeast coast of Baffin Island on Paallavvik Island.

Sicilien loaded a small detachment with arctic equipment, housing, fuel and weather and communications equipment for each of the CRYSTAL weather stations at the Boston Port of Embarkation and departed 21 September 1941. Sicilien made a stop at Halifax, Nova Scotia picking up five trawlers and three Norwegian vessels for the mission. Some of the ship's cargo was transferred to the smaller vessels at Halifax with a later transfer at Port Burwell, Nunavut near Crystal 1.

The Lives lost included 27 of the ships complement, including the master, and 19 Army passengers. The 31 survivors made it to rafts, were questioned by Germans and made Barahona, Dominican Republic a few hours later.

In 1958 the United States offered Denmark $5,396,202 in settlement of claims for use and loss of all forty vessels including Sicilien.

Footnotes

References

Bibliography

External links 
 M/S Sicilien with tugs, apparently immediately after launch.
 Ship, 21 June 1938, before fitting out
 Sicilien off Kronborg.
 Painting, M/S Marocco showing company colors. Note states the ship could carry 12 passengers.
 Danish Merchant Ships And Sailor Detained In US (Newsreel video including view of Sicilien in Coast Guard custody.)
 Seized Danish ships in New York, 1940
 National Archives image: Western Sea Frontier, Enemy Action and Distress Diary, June 13, 1942 — Report loss of Sicilien

1938 ships
Ships built in Helsingør
Merchant ships of Denmark
Transport ships of the United States Army
Maritime incidents in June 1942